Chloroselas is a genus of butterflies in the family Lycaenidae. The species of this genus are found in the Afrotropical realm.

Species
Chloroselas arabica (Riley, 1932)
Chloroselas argentea Riley, 1932
Chloroselas azurea Butler, 1900
Chloroselas esmeralda Butler, [1886]
Chloroselas mazoensis (Trimen, 1898)
Chloroselas minima Jackson, 1966
Chloroselas ogadenensis Jackson, 1966
Chloroselas overlaeti Stempffer, 1956
Chloroselas pseudozeritis (Trimen, 1873)
Chloroselas tamaniba (Walker, 1870)
Chloroselas taposana Riley, 1932
Chloroselas trembathi Collins & Larsen, 1991
Chloroselas vansomereni Jackson, 1966

External links
Chloroselas Butler, [1886] at Markku Savela's Lepidoptera and Some Other Life Forms
 Royal Museum of Central Africa Images

 
Lycaenidae genera
Taxa named by Arthur Gardiner Butler